Old Golden Throat is the 28th album by country singer Johnny Cash.  It was released in 1968 and is a collection of mostly previously released songs.   Nine of the fourteen tracks had previously appeared on Billboard's country singles chart.

Track listing

Personnel

 Johnny Cash - vocals, guitar
 Luther Perkins, Jack Clement, Johnny Western, Carl Perkins, Norman Blake - guitar
 Bob Johnson - lute, mandocello, guitar
 Marshall Grant - bass
 Buddy Harman, W.S. Holland - drums
 Don Helms - steel guitar
 Shot Jackson - steel guitar, Dobro
 Marvin Hughes, Floyd Cramer, Bill Pursell - piano
 Charlie McCoy - harmonica
 Gordon Terry - fiddle
 Maybelle Carter - harpsichord
 Karl Garvin, Bill McElhiney - trumpet
 Lew DeWitt - whistle
 The Anita Kerr Singers, The Carter Family, The Statler Brothers - backing vocals

Charts
Singles – Billboard (United States)

See also

 More of Old Golden Throat

External links
 Luma Electronic entry on Old Golden Throat

Old Golden Throat
Old Golden Throat
Old Golden Throat